Hypoxia-inducible factor 1-alpha, also known as HIF-1-alpha, is a subunit of a heterodimeric transcription factor hypoxia-inducible factor 1 (HIF-1) that is encoded by the HIF1A gene. The Nobel Prize in Physiology or Medicine 2019 was awarded for the discovery of HIF.

HIF1A is a basic helix-loop-helix PAS domain containing protein, and is considered as the master transcriptional regulator of cellular and developmental response to hypoxia. The dysregulation and overexpression of HIF1A by either hypoxia or genetic alternations have been heavily implicated in cancer biology, as well as a number of other pathophysiologies, specifically in areas of vascularization and angiogenesis, energy metabolism, cell survival, and tumor invasion. Two other alternative transcripts encoding different isoforms have been identified.

Structure 

HIF1 is a heterodimeric basic helix-loop-helix structure that is composed of HIF1A, the alpha subunit (this protein), and the aryl hydrocarbon receptor nuclear translocator (Arnt), the beta subunit. HIF1A contains a basic helix-loop-helix domain near the C-terminal, followed by two distinct PAS (PER-ARNT-SIM) domains, and a PAC (PAS-associated C-terminal) domain. The HIF1A polypeptide also contains a nuclear localization signal motif, two transactivating domains CTAD and NTAD, and an intervening inhibitory domain (ID) that can repress the transcriptional activities of CTAD and NTAD. There are a total of three HIF1A isoforms formed by alternative splicing, however isoform1 has been chosen as the canonical structure, and is the most extensively studied isoform in structure and function.

Gene and expression 

The human HIF1A gene encodes for the alpha subunit, HIF1A of the transcription factor hypoxia-inducible factor (HIF1). Its protein expression level can be measured by antibodies against HIF-1-alpha through various biological detection methods including western blot or immunostaining. HIF1A expression level is dependent on its GC-rich promoter activation. In most cells, HIF1A gene is constitutively expressed in low levels under normoxic conditions, however, under hypoxia, HIF1A transcription is often significantly upregulated. Typically, oxygen-independent pathway regulates protein expression, and oxygen-dependent pathway regulates degradation. In hypoxia-independent ways, HIF1A expression may be upregulated through a redox-sensitive mechanism.

Function 

The transcription factor HIF-1 plays an important role in cellular response to systemic oxygen levels in mammals. HIF1A activity is regulated by a host of post-translational modifications: hydroxylation, acetylation, and phosphorylation. HIF-1 is known to induce transcription of more than 60 genes, including VEGF and erythropoietin that are involved in biological processes such as angiogenesis and erythropoiesis, which assist in promoting and increasing oxygen delivery to hypoxic regions. HIF-1 also induces transcription of genes involved in cell proliferation and survival, as well as glucose and iron metabolism. In accordance with its dynamic biological role, HIF-1 responds to systemic oxygen levels by undergoing conformational changes, and associates with HRE regions of promoters of hypoxia-responsive genes to induce transcription.

HIF1A stability, subcellular localization, as well as transcriptional activity are especially affected by oxygen level. The alpha subunit forms a heterodimer with the beta subunit. Under normoxic conditions, VHL-mediated ubiquitin protease pathway rapidly degrades HIF1A; however, under hypoxia, HIF1A protein degradation is prevented and HIF1A levels accumulate to associate with HIF1B to exert transcriptional roles on target genes  Enzymes prolyl hydroxylase (PHD) and HIF prolyl hydroxylase (HPH) are involved in specific post-translational modification of HIF1A proline residues  (P402 and P564 within the ODD domain), which allows for VHL association with HIF1A. The enzymatic activity of oxygen sensor dioxygenase PHD is dependent on oxygen level as it requires oxygen as one of its main substrates to transfer to the proline residue of HIF1A. The hydroxylated proline residue of HIF1A is then recognized and buried in the hydrophobic core of von Hippel-Lindau tumor suppressor protein (VHL), which itself is part of a ubiquitin ligase enzyme. The hydroxylation of HIF1A proline residue also regulates its ability to associate with co-activators under hypoxia. Function of HIF1A gene can be effectively examined by siRNA knockdown based on an independent validation.

Repair, regeneration and rejuvenation 

In normal circumstances after injury HIF1A is degraded by prolyl hydroxylases (PHDs). In June 2015, scientists found that the continued up-regulation of HIF1A via PHD inhibitors regenerates lost or damaged tissue in mammals that have a repair response; and the continued down-regulation of HIF1A results in healing with a scarring response in mammals with a previous regenerative response to the loss of tissue. The act of regulating HIF1A can either turn off, or turn on the key processes of mammalian regeneration. One such regenerative process in which HIF1A is involved is peripheral nerve regeneration. Following axon injury, HIF1A activates VEGFA to promote regeneration and functional recovery. HIF1A also controls skin healing. Researchers at the Stanford University School of Medicine demonstrated that HIF1A activation was able to prevent and treat chronic wounds in diabetic and aged mice. Not only did the wounds in the mice heal more quickly, but the quality of the new skin was even better than the original. Additionally the regenerative effect of HIF-1A modulation on aged skin cells was described  and a rejuvenating effect on aged facial skin was demonstrated in patients. HIF modulation has also been linked to a beneficial effect on hair loss. The biotech company Tomorrowlabs GmbH, founded in Vienna in 2016 by the physician Dominik Duscher and pharmacologist Dominik Thor, makes use of this mechanism. Based on the patent-pending HSF ("HIF strengthening factor") active ingredient, products have been developed that are supposed to promote skin and hair regeneration.

Regulation 

HIF1A abundance (and its subsequent activity) is regulated transcriptionally in an NF-κB-dependent manner. In addition, the coordinated activity of the prolyl hydroxylases (PHDs) maintain the appropriate balance of HIF1A protein in the post-translation phase.

PHDs rely on iron among other molecules to hydroxylate HIF1A; as such, iron chelators such as desferrioxamine (DFO) have proven successful in HIF1A stabilization. HBO (Hyperbaric oxygen therapy) and HIF1A imitators such as cobalt chloride have also been successfully utilized.

Factors increasing HIF1A

  Modulator of Degradation:
 Oxygen-Dependent:
 EPF UCP (degrades pHVL)
 VDU2   (de-ubiquitinates HIF1A)
 SUMOylation (via RSUME)
 DeSUMOylation ( via SENP1)
 Oxygen-independent:
 Calcineurin A ( Ca2+-dependent via RACK1)
 Modulators of translation:
 RNA-binding proteins, PTB, and HuR
 PtdIns3K and MAPK pathways
 IRES-mediated translation
 calcium signaling
 miRNAs

Factors decreasing HIF1A

  Modulator of Degradation:
 Oxygen-Dependent:
 PHD, VHL, OS-9 and SSAT2
 SUMOylation
 Oxygen-independent
 RACK1 and SSAT1
 GSK3β
 FOXO4
Modulators of translation:
 Calcium signaling
 miRNAs

Role in cancer 

HIF1A is overexpressed in many human cancers. HIF1A  overexpression is heavily implicated in promoting tumor growth and metastasis through its role in initiating angiogenesis and regulating cellular metabolism to overcome hypoxia. Hypoxia promotes apoptosis in both normal and tumor cells. However, hypoxic conditions in tumor microenvironment especially, along with accumulation of genetic alternations often contribute to HIF1A  overexpression.

Significant HIF1A  expression has been noted in most solid tumors studied, which include cancers of the gastric, colon, breast, pancreas, kidneys, prostate, ovary, brain, and bladder. Clinically, elevated HIF1A  levels in a number of cancers, including cervical cancer, non-small-cell lung carcinoma, breast cancer (LV-positive and negative), oligodendroglioma, oropharyngeal cancer, ovarian cancer, endometrial cancer, esophageal cancer, head and neck cancer, and stomach cancer, have been associated with aggressive tumor progression, and thus has been implicated as a predictive and prognostic marker for resistance to radiation treatment, chemotherapy, and increased mortality. HIF1A expression may also regulate breast tumor progression. Elevated HIF1A levels may be detected in early cancer development, and have been found in early ductal carcinoma in situ, a pre-invasive stage in breast cancer development, and is also  associated with increased microvasculature density in tumor lesions. Moreover, despite histologically-determined low-grade, lymph-node negative breast tumor in a subset of patients examined, detection of significant HIF1A expression was able to independently predict poor response to therapy. Similar findings have been reported in brain cancer and ovarian cancer studies as  well, and suggest at regulatory role of HIF1A in initiating angiogenesis through interactions with pro-angiogenic factors such as VEGF. 
Studies of glioblastoma multiforme show striking similarity between HIF1A expression pattern and that of VEGF gene transcription level. In addition, high-grade glioblastoma multiform tumors with high VEGF expression pattern, similar to breast cancer with HIF1A overexpression, display significant signs of tumor neovascularization. This further suggests the regulatory role of HIF1A in promoting tumor progression, likely through hypoxia-induced VEGF expression pathways.

HIF1A overexpression in tumors may also occur in a hypoxia-independent pathway. In hemangioblastoma, HIF1A expression is found in most cells sampled from the well-vascularized tumor. Although in both renal carcinoma and hemangioblastoma, the von Hippel-Lindau gene is inactivated, HIF1A is still expressed at high levels. In addition to VEGF overexpression in response elevated HIF1A levels, the PI3K/AKT pathway is also involved in tumor growth. In prostate cancers, the commonly occurring PTEN mutation is associated with tumor progression toward aggressive stage, increased vascular density and angiogenesis.

During hypoxia, tumor suppressor p53 overexpression may be associated with HIF1A-dependent pathway to initiate apoptosis. Moreover, p53-independent pathway may also induce apoptosis through the Bcl-2 pathway. However, overexpression of HIF1A is cancer- and individual-specific, and depends on the accompanying genetic alternations and levels of pro- and anti-apoptotic factors present. One study on epithelial ovarian cancer shows HIF1A and nonfunctional tumor suppressor p53  is correlated with low levels of tumor cell apoptosis and poor prognosis.  Further, early-stage esophageal cancer patients with demonstrated overexpression of HIF1 and absence of BCL2 expression also failed photodynamic therapy.

While research efforts to develop therapeutic drugs to target hypoxia-associated tumor cells have been ongoing for many years, there has not yet been any breakthrough that has shown selectivity and effectiveness at targeting HIF1A pathways to decrease tumor progression and angiogenesis. Successful therapeutic approaches in the future may also be highly case-specific to particular cancers and individuals, and seem unlikely to be widely applicable due to the genetically heterogenous nature of the many cancer types and subtypes.

Interactions 

HIF1A has been shown to interact with:

 ARNTL,
 ARNT,
 CREBB,
 EP300,
 HIF1AN,
 Mdm2,
 NR4A,
 P53,
 PSMA7,
 STAT3,
 UBC,
 VH  and
 VHL.
 GR (NR3C1).

See also 
 Hypoxia inducible factors

References

Further reading

External links 
 
 
 Scientific animation of HIF-1alpha in complex with ARNT on DNA: https://www.youtube.com/watch?v=azIEzLXXyHM

Transcription factors
PAS-domain-containing proteins